Courts of Utah include:
;State courts of Utah
Utah Supreme Court
Utah Court of Appeals
Utah District Courts (8 districts)
Utah Juvenile Courts
Utah Justice Courts

Federal courts located in Utah
United States District Court for the District of Utah

References

External links
National Center for State Courts – directory of state court websites.

Courts in the United States